Narsunda is a river of Kishoreganj District in Bangladesh. Narsunda River is created from Brahmaputra River at Hossainpur Upazila. After the creation of the river, going through Jangalia Union, Pakundia Upazila and through Kishoreganj town and beside Govt. Gurudayal College. Famous writer Nirad C. Chaudhuri mentioned this river name in his famous autobiography, The Autobiography of an Unknown Indian. Length of this river is around 60 km.

References

Rivers of Bangladesh
Rivers of Dhaka Division